The National Council of Turkmenistan was Turkmenistan's bicameral national legislative body or parliament from March 2021 until January 2023. The upper chamber was the People's Council and the lower chamber was the Assembly. The National Council was created in March 2021 following election of members to the upper chamber, which in turn followed a constitutional amendment in late 2020. 

In January 2023 both chambers of parliament proposed to abolish the Halk Maslahaty as a legislative organ, to reform it as an independent body, and to place all legislative authority with a unicameral Mejlis. The National Council was accordingly abolished by unanimous vote of its members in a joint session of the People's Council and Assembly on 21 January 2023.

See also
 Assembly of Turkmenistan
 People's Council of Turkmenistan
 Politics of Turkmenistan

References

Political history of Turkmenistan